The 5th National Television Awards ceremony was held at the Royal Albert Hall on 26 October 1999 and was hosted by Sir Trevor McDonald.

Awards

References

National Television Awards
National Television Awards
National Television Awards
1990 in London
National Television Awards
National Television Awards